The Great Lakes islands consist of about 35,000 islands (scattered throughout Great Lakes), created by uneven glacial activity in the Great Lakes Basin in Canada (Ontario) and the United States. The largest of these is Manitoulin Island in Lake Huron in the province of Ontario. At 1,068 square miles (2,766 km²), it is the largest lake island in the world.

List of notable Great Lakes islands and archipelagos
Adventure Island, Wisconsin, United States
Apostle Islands
Ballast Island
Barker's Island
Bass Islands
Beaver Island, United States
Beaver Islands, including Beaver Island and nearby islands, see Beaver Islands State Wildlife Research Area
Belle Isle
Bois Blanc Island, Michigan, United States
Bois Blanc Island (Ontario)
Calf Island - Grosse Ile, Michigan, United States
Cana Island
Caribou Island
Catawba Island - former island presently connected to mainland Ohio, United States
Celeron Island, Gibraltar, Michigan, United States
Chambers Island, Wisconsin, in Lake Michigan's Green Bay
Cockburn Island
Detroit Island, Wisconsin, United States
Dickinson Island, Saint Clair River
Drummond Island (contains Drummond Township, Michigan), Michigan, United States
Edmond Island - Gibraltar, Michigan, United States
Elba Island - Grosse Ile, Michigan, United States
Fawn Island, Saint Clair River
Fighting Island, Detroit River
Fish Island (Wisconsin)
Flowerpot Island, Tobermory, Ontario
Foleys Island, Luna Pier area
Fox Island
Fox Islands, Michigan, United States
Fox Islands (Ontario)
Gard Island, Michigan-Ohio border area, United States
Grassy Island - Wyandotte, Michigan, United States
Gravel Island (Wisconsin)
Green Bay Islands
Green Island, Saint Clair River
Green Island, Wisconsin, in Lake Michigan's Green Bay
Grosse Ile, Michigan, United States
Gull Island, Wisconsin, United States
Gull Island, Michigan, United States
Gull Island, Saint Clair River
Harsens Island
Hat Island, Wisconsin, in Lake Michigan's Green Bay
Hickory Island, Grosse Ile, Michigan, United States
Hog Island (Wisconsin)
Horse Island, city of Gibraltar in the state of Michigan, in the Detroit River
Horseshoe Island, Wisconsin, in Lake Michigan's Green Bay
Howe Island
Indian Island, Michigan-Ohio border area, United States
Isle Royale, Michigan, United States
Johnson's Island
Kelleys Island
Mackinac Island, Michigan, United States
Madeline Island
Manitou Islands, Michigan, United States:
North Manitou Island
South Manitou Island
Manitoulin Island
McDonald Island, Saint Clair River
Meso Island, Grosse Ile, Michigan, United States
Michipicoten Island
Middle Island, Saint Clair River
Neebish Island, Michigan, United States
North Island, Saint Clair River
Parry Island
Pelee Island
Pilot Island, Wisconsin
Plum Island (Wisconsin)
Potawatomi Islands on the eastern side of Lake Michigan's Green Bay
Rattlesnake Island
Rock Island (Wisconsin)
Saint Ignace Island
Saint Joseph Island, Ontario, Canada
Sister Islands in Lake Michigan's Green Bay
Slate Islands, Ontario, Canada
Sleeping Giant Island
South Bass Island
Spider Island (Wisconsin)
Strawberry Island, Saint Clair River
Strawberry Islands in Lake Michigan's Green Bay
Sugar Island, Michigan, United States
Sugar Island, Ohio, United States
Swan Island, Grosse Ile, Michigan, United States
Thirty Thousand Islands
Toronto Islands
Walpole Island
Washington Island, Wisconsin, in Lake Michigan; largest of the Potawatomi Islands
Wolfe Island, Ontario, Canada

See also 

List of populated islands of the Great Lakes
List of Lake Erie Islands
List of islands of Michigan
List of islands of Ontario
Thousand Islands
 

 
Great Lakes-related lists
Great Lakes
Great Lakes
Lists of landforms of Michigan
Lists of landforms of Pennsylvania
Lists of landforms of Wisconsin
Indiana geography-related lists
Lists of landforms of New York (state)
Ohio geography-related lists
Islands, Great Lakes
Great Lakes